The third Rutte cabinet was the cabinet of the Netherlands from 26 October 2017 until 10 January 2022 (since 15 January 2021 demissionary). It was formed by a coalition government of the political parties People's Party for Freedom and Democracy (VVD), Christian Democratic Appeal (CDA), Democrats 66 (D66) and Christian Union (CU) after the general election of 2017. The cabinet formation took 225 days, a record high in the Netherlands.

The cabinet served during the late 2010s and the start of the 2020s. Notable issues during the third Rutte cabinet included the childcare allowance affair, the farmers' protests and the COVID-19 pandemic in the Netherlands. The cabinet fell on 15 January 2021 as a response to a critical report about the childcare allowance affair.

Formation
The 2017 general election resulted in a House of Representatives where at least four parties would be required to form a coalition with a majority (76 seats). Media sources speculated that incumbent Prime Minister Mark Rutte of the VVD would seek to form a government with the support of the centre-right CDA and liberal D66. The CU was thought to be the most likely candidate to be the fourth member of the coalition. Minister of Health, Welfare and Sport, Edith Schippers, was selected by the VVD to serve as the party's informateur on 16 March and appointed by Speaker of the House Khadija Arib, seeking to determine whether Jesse Klaver of GroenLinks (GL) solely desired a left-wing government, or instead simply viewed the VVD as an unlikely coalition partner. Similarly, talks with Emile Roemer of the Socialist Party (SP), who repeatedly stated during the campaign that his party would not govern with the VVD, remained a possibility.

The leaders of D66, the CDA, the PvdA, the VVD, the SP, GL and the CU stated that they would not enter a coalition with the PVV; Roemer also said that the SP would not join a coalition with the VVD.

The first proposed coalition was one involving the VVD-CDA-D66 and GL. This was the preferred coalition of Alexander Pechtold, Lodewijk Asscher and Gert-Jan Segers, while Jesse Klaver continued to argue that the major policy differences between GL and the VVD would make a coalition difficult. Nevertheless, the four parties began more serious negotiations toward a coalition agreement. The Nederlandse Omroep Stichting (NOS) reported that "labour market reform, investment in law enforcement and additional money for nursing homes" would be areas of agreement between the parties, while "refugee policy, income distribution, climate and medical ethics issues are potential stumbling blocks".

On 15 May, talks on the proposed four-way VVD-CDA-D66-GL coalition failed. It was reported that the main dispute concerned immigration, but GL Leader Jesse Klaver cited climate issues and income differences as other issues where the parties disagreed. The end of the talks was reported to be a consensus decision, with no party blaming any others.

Coalition talks were reported to be at an impasse, with the VVD and CDA favouring a coalition with the CU, D66 favouring a coalition with either the PvdA or the SP, the SP being absolutely opposed to a coalition with the VVD, the CDA being opposed to a coalition without the VVD, the PvdA rejecting any coalition, and all parties with more than five seats rejecting a coalition with the PVV. D66 said that it would consider a coalition with the CU very difficult due to disagreements on medical-ethical issues such as doctor-assisted suicide, due to the lack of representation of the political left within that coalition, and due to the small majority of one seat in both chambers, which could make for an unstable coalition.

In late June 2017, discussions began again between the VVD, D66, the CDA and the CU under the lead of new informateur Herman Tjeenk Willink. After a three-week summer break, talks resumed on 9 August 2017, and were reported to be close to a conclusion due to representatives of unions and employers' organizations joining the discussions, which typically happens near the end of such negotiations. In September 2017, a budget deal compromise was reached allowing the coalition talks to continue. While still 'close to conclusion', it appeared likely that the talks about government formation would exceed the record since World War II of 208 days set in 1977. After 208 days of negotiations, the VVD, D66, CDA and CU agreed to a coalition under a third informateur, Gerrit Zalm, and all members of the House of Representatives of the involved parties approved the agreement on 9 October 2017. On 26 October the new cabinet was formally installed, 225 days after the elections, setting a record for the longest cabinet formation in Dutch history.

On 7 October 2019, the government lost its majority when Wybren van Haga, after being expelled from Rutte's VVD party for allegedly renovating a building he owned without the necessary permits, decided to sit as an Independent. Had he resigned, another member on the VVD electoral party list would have replaced him, maintaining Rutte's parliamentary majority of one. According to Politico EU, Van Haga wrote he would vote with the government on established coalition policy, but would make his own decisions on future laws.

Policy
Government
The Third Rutte cabinet repealed the Referendum Act passed in 2015, although that proposal was written in none of the coalition parties' election platforms. It stated the law had not delivered what was expected; results from the 2016 Ukraine–European Union Association Agreement referendum and 2018 Intelligence and Security Services Act referendum have been going against government proposals. The cabinet also deconstitutionalised the method of appointment of mayors and King's commissioners, thus allowing the method to be changed by law.

Finance
The cabinet plans to simplify income tax, reducing the number of tax brackets to two. Income below 68,600 would be taxed at 36.9% and income from 68,600 onward at 49.5%. There are also plans to increase the lower VAT rate from 6 to 9%. A plan to abolish dividend tax proved so controversial that it was discarded in October 2018. Instead, the cabinet will now lower corporation tax more than was initially planned; the higher rate will be lowered from 25 to 20.5%, and the lower rate from 20 to 15%.

Justice
In judicial matters, the cabinet intends to end the automatic conditional release of prisoners after two thirds of their sentence and to shorten asylum permits from five to three years, after which refugees can request an extension of another two years.

Labour
The cabinet intends to reform the labour market and pension system. Laws around the termination of employment will be relaxed, while paid sick leave will be shortened. The cabinet initially planned to allow employers to pay handicapped people below the minimum wage, which would then be supplemented by local government. However, this proposal was later retracted.

Environment
The cabinet pledged to ban the sale of non-emission-free cars by 2030. There are also plans to introduce a flight tax by 2021. In March 2018, the cabinet also pledged to end gas extraction from the Groningen gas field within twelve years.

Composition

References

External links
Official
  Kabinet-Rutte III (2017 - ) Parlement & Politiek
  Kabinet-Rutte III Rijksoverheid

Cabinets of the Netherlands
2017 establishments in the Netherlands
2022 disestablishments in the Netherlands
Cabinets established in 2017
Cabinets disestablished in 2022